Alpar Csoma (born 22 March 1984), is a Romanian futsal player who plays for City'us and the Romanian national futsal team.

References

External links
UEFA profile

1984 births
Living people
Romanian men's futsal players